The Maccabiah Games is a quadrennial event which began in 1932. Events at the Games are divided into two groups: track and field events (including sprints, middle- and long-distance running, hurdling, relays, and field events), and road running (including a road 10K run and half marathon).

Men's records

Notes

Women's records

See also
Athletics at the Maccabiah Games
List of Maccabiah medalists in athletics (men)
List of Maccabiah medalists in athletics (women)

References

Athletics
Maccabiah Games
R